Jeevithayaathra is a 1965 Indian Malayalam-language film, directed by J. Sasikumar and produced by K. P. Kottarakkara. The film stars Prem Nazir, Madhu, Sheela, Ambika, Sukumari and Adoor Bhasi. The film had musical score by P. S. Divakar.

Cast 

Prem Nazir as Venu/Minnal Ramu
Madhu as Rajan
Sheela as Radha
Ambika as Lakshmi
Sukumari as Vasanthy
Adoor Bhasi as Madhavan
Bahadoor as Kochappan
S. P. Pillai as Ring master
 Kunchan
Thikkurissy Sukumaran Nair as Parameshwara Kurup/Venu's father
Sobha as Meena
Friend Ramaswamy as Menon
Prathapachandran as Registrar
Pattom Sadan (Uncredited)
 Kottayam Chellappan as Police Inspector
 M.G Menon
 R. Viswanathan 
 Baby Rajani

Soundtrack 
The music was composed by P. S. Divakar and the lyrics were written by Abhayadev and P. Bhaskaran.

References

External links 
 

1965 films
1960s Malayalam-language films
Films directed by J. Sasikumar